The Rockcastle Sandstone is a geologic formation in Georgia. It preserves fossils dating back to the Carboniferous period.

See also

 List of fossiliferous stratigraphic units in Georgia (U.S. state)
 Paleontology in Georgia (U.S. state)

References
 

Carboniferous Georgia (U.S. state)